The Town of Bassendean is a local government area in the northeastern suburbs of the Western Australian capital city of Perth,  west of the industrial centre of Midland and about  northeast of Perth's central business district. The Town of Bassendean is a member of the Eastern Metropolitan Regional Council.

History
The West Guildford Road District was created on 10 May 1901. It was renamed the Bassendean Road District on 7 July 1922, and on 1 July 1961, became the Shire of Bassendean following the enactment of the Local Government Act 1960, which reformed all remaining road districts into shires. It assumed its current name when it gained town status on 1 July 1975.

Wards
The Town does not have any wards however in the past it was divided into three wards.

Suburbs
The suburbs of the Town of Bassendean with population and size figures based on the most recent Australian census:

Mayors

The current mayor is Kath Hamilton, who was elected in October 2021. Previous Mayor Renee McLennan is Deputy Mayor.

Population

Heritage listed places

As of 2023, 335 places are heritage-listed in the Town of Bassendean, of which 13 are on the State Register of Heritage Places, among them the former Bassendean Fire Station and the Bassendean Oval.

References

External links
 

 
Bassendean